Wayside Inn Historic District is a historic district in Sudbury, Massachusetts, including the Wayside Inn.

Wayside Inn may also refer to:

Wayside Inn (Gibsland, Louisiana)
Wayside Inn (Arlington, Massachusetts)
Wayside Inn (Sudbury), Massachusetts